Dorothy Jordan (August 9, 1906 – December 7, 1988) was an American movie actress who had a short, successful career beginning in 1929.

Career
Born in Clarksville, Tennessee, Jordan studied at what is now Rhodes College and the American Academy of Dramatic Arts. She performed in Broadway musicals, including Garrick Gaieties.

Jordan made her screen debut in the 1929 film The Taming of the Shrew. She made 22 more films in the next four years, including Min and Bill (1930) with Wallace Beery and Marie Dressler and The Cabin in the Cotton (1932) with Bette Davis. During this time, she appeared in films with Ramon Novarro, Clark Gable, Lionel Barrymore, Walter Huston and Jimmy Durante.

Film retirement and return

In 1933, Jordan left films and married filmmaker and screenwriter Merian C. Cooper, who co-wrote, produced and directed the 1933 film King Kong. The couple had three children, a son and two daughters.

In 1937, Jordan came out of retirement to try for the role of Melanie Hamilton in Gone with the Wind. Cooper was a good friend of and frequent collaborator with Western director John Ford, forming Argosy Productions in 1947. It was for Argosy's The Sun Shines Bright, directed by Ford in 1953, that Jordan again came out of retirement for a small role. She had another small role as the sister-in-law of Ethan Edwards in the epic 1956 Argosy film The Searchers. Jordan appeared in a small role in the John Ford film The Wings of Eagles in 1957, then retired permanently.

Later years
Jordan and Cooper lived in Coronado, California and remained married until his death of cancer on April 21, 1973. Jordan died of congestive heart failure on December 7, 1988, aged 82, in Cedars-Sinai Medical Center in Los Angeles, California. Her body was cremated at the Chapel of the Pines Crematory in Los Angeles, California, and her ashes scattered at sea.

Filmography

References

External links

 
 
 
 Photographs and literature

American film actresses
1906 births
1988 deaths
People from Clarksville, Tennessee
Actresses from Tennessee
Actresses from Los Angeles
American tap dancers
20th-century American actresses
20th-century American dancers